.sb is the Internet country code top-level domain (ccTLD) for Solomon Islands. It is administered through the Council of Country Code Administrators (CoCCA).

2nd Level domains
As of February 12, 2016 registering domains directly at the second level is allowed. Second-level domains are manually reviewed and must be approved by the NIC before they're added to the zone.

Unrestricted global registration:
 com.sb
 net.sb

Restricted registration:
 edu.sb (educational institutions)
 org.sb (nonprofit organisations)
 gov.sb (government agencies or departments)

External links
 IANA .sb whois information
 .sb registration website for local registrants
 Our Telekom

Country code top-level domains
Communications in the Solomon Islands

sv:Toppdomän#S